Scotinotylus eutypus is a species of sheet weaver found in the Holarctic. It was described by Chamberlin in 1949.

References

Linyphiidae
Arthropods of Asia
Holarctic spiders
Spiders described in 1949